Project African Wilderness (PAW) is a not for profit organisation with the express purpose of protecting and restoring the Mwabvi Wildlife Reserve in Malawi.

History
In 2004, PAW was co-founded by English regeneration consultant Gaynor Asquith and a South African safari company owner. PAW now has a team of 48 in Malawi and as many volunteers in Europe working to protect a remote and beautiful part of Africa.

At the time of PAW's founding, illegal poaching made the Mwabvi wildlife reserve was almost devoid of animals.

PAW is not only a conservation project. Money that is raised is put into the development of projects (and infrastructure) that will benefit the local people of Mwabvi and allow them to take control of their own livelihoods through businesses and education relating to eco-tourism.

In February 2007, Project African Wilderness signed a long-term legal agreement with the Malawi Government's Department of National Parks and Wildlife to take over the conservation and development of Mwabvi Wildlife Reserve, which is one of the nine National Parks in Malawi and was first protected in 1928. The environmental conservation team is led by Barry Kerr, an experienced South African conservation and environmentalist. His partner Adele Kerr carries out marketing and oversees the growing and vital community development programme.

In 2010, as a result of the work done by project African Wilderness and their Malawian sister company the Mwabvi Wildlife and Community Trust (MWCT) Mwabvi opened Njate Lodge for tourists.

Reserve Size

The reserve is now less than half its original size, wood and game poaching continue and PAW are first working to stop deliberate fires which destroy seedlings and saplings. If the habitat goes the animals will not come back. The Department of National Parks and Wildlife has up to 12 game scouts at Mwabvi but they have neither resources nor support to prevent poaching and protect the wilderness.

PAW has one of several 'concessions' given to various organisations by the Government to try out different ways of exploiting the natural resources for tourism. Mwabvi will never be a major tourist destination but the area lends itself to use for conservation training, and over time game scout training will take place. The former National Game Scout Training Centre at Liwonde National Park closed some time ago and the country needs more trained game scouts.

Geographics
When working in this part of Malawi it is necessary to take into account that there are 60,000 people living around the edge of the Reserve - this is a highly populated area. The local primary school has 2 teachers, 2 classrooms and 250 pupils. The nearest town, Bangula, has a primary school with 6 classrooms, 8 staff and 3,000 pupils. Life expectancy is 32. The Malawi average life expectancy is 38 years. AIDS and malaria often kills game scouts just five years after they are trained, and hardly any of the local children know the reserve exists.

Any person or organisation working in this part of sub Saharan Africa should expect to be there for the long term and save the natural environment for future generations. It is essential to work with the local people, be involved with appropriate education programmes, and not rely on short term grants and aid.

Mission
The list of projects needed to create a sustainable programme for the long term that PAW and others are working on covers:
 Protection and restoration of the wildlife reserve
 Eco-tourism
 Small Enterprise Development
 University twinning scheme
 Secondary school education programme
 Volunteer programme
 Fundraising

Project African Wilderness has charitable status in the United Kingdom and operates through the Mwabvi Wildlife and Community Trust in Malawi with volunteers and paid professional employees in both countries. Employing over 50 local people, PAW and MWCT have significantly extended the road system within the reserve and have built a lodge and a campsite, thus opening up the park for tourism. They have also extended the facilities at Chipembere Camp, providing volunteer accommodation and facilities for their various outreach projects. They also run a growing predator breeding programme, and have enclosures for a number of lions and other cats.

References

Bradt Guide to Malawi, Phillip Briggs and Mary-Anne Bartlett. 4th Edition. September 2006.

External links
Project African Wilderness website
Malawi Tourism: Mwabvi Wildlife Reserve
Envirolink Northwest

Environmental organisations based in Malawi
Nature conservation organisations based in the United Kingdom
Environmental charities based in the United Kingdom
Foreign charities operating in Malawi
Environmental organizations established in 1995
1995 establishments in the United Kingdom